WBLN may refer to:

 WBLN-LP, a low-power radio station (104.9 FM) licensed to Glens Falls, New York, United States
 WZYK, a radio station (94.7 FM) licensed to Clinton, Kentucky, United States, which used the call sign WBLN from March 1997 to March 1998
 WFGS, a radio station (103.7 FM) licensed to Murray, Kentucky, United States, which used the call sign WBLN-FM from October 1988 to March 1997
 WBLN (WB 100+), a former television station (channel 14) in Charleston, South Carolina, United States
 WYZZ-TV, a television station (channel 43) licensed to Bloomington, Illinois, United States, which used the call sign WBLN from 1982 to September 1985
 an earlier tv station from the same license city (Bloomington, Illinois) in the 1950s